Oscar Aldo Hernández Quijano (born August 27, 1994, in León, Guanajuato), known as Oscar Hernández, is a Mexican professional association football (soccer) player who plays for Monarcas Morelia Premier

External links
 

Living people
1994 births
Mexican footballers
Sportspeople from León, Guanajuato
Liga MX players
Association footballers not categorized by position
21st-century Mexican people